Lycée franco-équatorien La Condamine is a French international school in Quito, Ecuador. It has programmes from the primary level until the terminale, the final year of lycée (senior high school or lyceum). It is part of the network of the Agency for French Education Abroad.

References

External links
  Lycée La Condamine

International schools in Quito
Secondary schools in Quito
French international schools in South America
Ecuador–France relations